Priestly robe may refer to:

 Alb, Christianity
 Priestly robe (Judaism)